The Zelenopillia rocket attack took place on 11 July 2014 during the War in Donbas. The rocket barrage, which was launched from inside Russian territory by Russian forces , killed 37 Ukrainian soldiers and border guards in a camp at Zelenopillia, Luhansk Oblast.

Rocket attack 
In the early morning of 11 July 2014, Russian forces fired a barrage of 9K51M "Tornado-G" rockets in 40 salvos beginning at 4:40 a.m. They targeted an armored convoy of the Ukrainian Ground Forces from a distance of 15 km. The Ukrainian column was camped in a field near the village of Zelenopillia, situated along the main highway to Luhansk in the Sverdlovsk Raion near Rovenky. The town is located only 9 km from the Russian border. The Ukrainian armored brigades were a part of a larger contingent of troops guarding the Ukrainian-Russian border against the illegal movement of military equipment from Russia into Eastern Ukraine.

At least 19 soldiers were killed and 93 others were injured in the rocket strike. Four Ural-4320 transport trucks full of troops were struck. According to one Ukrainian soldier's account, the 1st Battalion of the 79th Mykolaiv Airmobile Brigade was "almost completely destroyed" during the rocket onslaught. Chief physician of a regional hospital, Serhiy Ryzhenko reported the wounded to be in grave condition, with some undergoing traumatic leg amputations and loss of limbs.

According to an investigation a year later, 30 Ukrainian soldiers and 7 border guards were killed and over 100 soldiers were wounded during that strike. Ukrainian border guards Colonel Ihor Momot was among the fallen. Materiel losses were equivalent to two battalions worth of equipment.

Reactions 
In response to the rocket strike, Ukrainian president Petro Poroshenko held an emergency cabinet meeting and issued a statement condemning the attack and vowing to "find and destroy" the pro-Russian rebels accountable. He also said for every Ukrainian serviceman's life the militants will pay with "tens and hundreds of their own".

The United States Department of Treasury instituted a new set of sanctions on Russia after reliable evidence emerged that the rockets were fired from within Russian territory. Videos by a resident of the rocket launchers firing at Ukrainian positions matched the very same Google Maps view of the same physical features inside Russian territory bordering Ukraine.

See also 
 Outline of the Russo-Ukrainian War
 Russian cross-border artillery shelling of Ukraine (2014)
 Novosvitlivka refugee convoy attack
 Volnovakha bus attack
 January 2015 Mariupol rocket attack

References

Bibliography

 Galeotti, Mark (2017) The Modern Russian Army 1992–2016. Bloomsbury Publishing.

Further reading 

 The Battles of Zelenopillya: Part 1 of 2

2014 in Ukraine
Battles of the war in Donbas
Luhansk People's Republic
War in Donbas
Battles in 2014
July 2014 events in Ukraine
2014 in Russia